Progresso da Lunda Sul was an Angolan sports club from Saurimo, the capital city of Lunda Sul province. The club was an affiliate of Progresso do Sambizanga and shares the same outfit colours. Originally established as Progresso do Sambukila, the club changed its name in 2014 to its current denomination.

The club was owned by Angolan businessman Ernesto dos Santos Lino aka Santos Bikuku.

In 2014, the club won the 2014 Angolan second division Group B thus being promoted to the 2015 Girabola.

Achievements
Angolan League: 0

Angolan Cup: 0

Angolan SuperCup: 0

Gira Angola: 0

League & Cup Positions

Recent seasons
Progresso da Lunda Sul's season-by-season performance since 2011:

 PR = Preliminary round, 1R = First round, GS = Group stage, R32 = Round of 32, R16 = Round of 16, QF = Quarter-finals, SF = Semi-finals

Players and staff

Players

Staff

Manager history and performance

See also
Girabola
Gira Angola

External links
 Girabola.com profile
 Zerozero.pt profile
 Facebook profile

References

Football clubs in Angola
Sports clubs in Angola